Thomas Aldred may refer to:

 Tom Aldred (born 1990), English professional footballer
Thomas Aldred (MP) (died 1562), English politician and member of Parliament, represented Kingston upon Hull